Homeros Boulevard is a partially completed thoroughfare in İzmir, Turkey. The boulevard was then named Homeros Boulevard after the legendary ancient author who once lived in western Anatolia. 

The boulevard starts at the east end of the Konak Tunnel, at a junction with the D.300/D.550 highway, and heads east. This part of the boulevard is elevated on a viaduct that crosses the Meles creek and the İzmir-Eğirdir railway, as well as Menderes Avenue, until joining Onat Avenue at a roundabout intersection.

Pictures

References

Streets in İzmir
Konak District
Buca District
Bornova District